The Bridge School Collection, Vol. 1 is a downloadable audio collection of 80 selected acoustic 
performances, recorded between 1986 and 2006, from the Bridge School's Benefit Concerts. The 21 November 2006 iTunes distribution of the collection includes a digital booklet. 
All tracks are available for individual purchase except Neil Young's tracks which are by album only.

Disc 1
 "It's All Been Done" by Barenaked Ladies – 3.17
 "Jane" by Barenaked Ladies – 5.26
 "Burn One Down/With My Own Two Hands" by Ben Harper – 6.26
 "In The Lord's Arms" by Ben Harper – 3.19
 "There Will Be A Light" by Ben Harper – 3.45
 "Whipping Boy" by Ben Harper – 4.53
 "For What It's Worth" by Billy Idol – 3.30
 "Rebel Yell" by Billy Idol – 5.27
 "Home" by Bonnie Raitt – 3.26
 "The Road Is My Middle Name" by Bonnie Raitt – 4.12
 "True Blue" by Bright Eyes – 4.39
 "We Are Nowhere, And It's Now" by Bright Eyes – 4.18
 "Murder Tonight In The Trailer Park" by Cowboy Junkies – 4.33
 "Sun Comes Up It's Tuesday Morning" by Cowboy Junkies – 4.27

Disc 2
 "Just A Song Before I Go" by Crosby, Stills & Nash – 2.34
 "Suite: Judy Blue Eyes" by Crosby, Stills & Nash – 9.25
 "The Lee Shore" by Crosby, Stills & Nash – 3.59
 "This Old House" by Crosby, Stills, Nash & Young – 5.02
 "Crash" by Dave Matthews – 5.35
 "Warehouse" by Dave Matthews Band – 8.01
 "Better Man" by Eddie Vedder – 4.13
 "Love Hurts" by Emmylou Harris – 3.07
 "Prayer In Open D" by Emmylou Harris – 4.38
 "Sweet Old World" by Emmylou Harris – 4.19
 "The Maker" by Emmylou Harris & Daniel Lanois – 6.10
 "I'll Tell Him Tonight" by Hayden – 3.36
 "I'm To Blame" by Hayden – 2.29
 "Hannah Jane" by Hootie & The Blowfish – 3.47

Disc 3
 "Let It Breathe" by Hootie & The Blowfish – 3.50
 "Closer To Fine" by Indigo Girls – 4.14
 "Get Out The Map" by Indigo Girls – 3.15
 "Gone" by Jack Johnson – 1.58
 "Carolina On My Mind" by James Taylor – 4.54
 "Copperline" by James Taylor – 4.20
 "Fire And Rain" by James Taylor – 4.27
 "Something In The Way She Moves" by James Taylor – 3.16
 "Trains" by Jill Sobule – 3.45
 "Rebellious" by Kacy Crowley – 4.31
 "Scars" by Kacy Crowley – 4.06
 "Crazy Dream" by Los Lonely Boys – 4.45
 "Heaven" by Los Lonely Boys – 5.19

Disc 4
 "Perfect Day" by Lou Reed – 4.13
 "Vicious" by Lou Reed – 6.44
 "Bring Me Some Water" by Melissa Etheridge – 4.05
 "You Can Sleep While I Drive" by Melissa Etheridge – 4.00
 "Fade To Black" by Metallica – 8.34
 "The Four Horsemen" by Metallica – 6.00
 "Comes A Time/Sugar Mountain" by Neil Young – 10.22
 "Cortez The Killer" by Neil Young & Dave Matthews Band – 15.53
 "Creepin'" In by Norah Jones – 3.31
 "Nearness Of You" by Norah Jones – 2.25
 "Wing" by Patti Smith – 4.41
 "Corduroy" by Pearl Jam – 4.44
 "Nothing As It Seems" by Pearl Jam – 5.51

Disc 5
 "So I Am Over You" by Pete Droge – 3.46
 "Straylin Street" by Pete Droge – 4.42
 "Everybody Hurts" by R.E.M. – 6.09
 "I've Been High" by R.E.M. – 3.29
 "Losing My Religion" by R.E.M. – 4.36
 "The One I Love" by R.E.M. – 3.32
 "Beverly Hills" by Red Hot Chili Peppers – 2.27
 "Californication" (Acoustic) by Red Hot Chili Peppers – 5.32
 "I Just Want Something To Do" by Red Hot Chili Peppers – 5.21
 "Road Trippin'" by Red Hot Chili Peppers – 3.08
 "Oh My Sweet Carolina" by Ryan Adams – 5.02
 "The Fools We Are As Men" by Ryan Adams – 3.55
 "Elsewhere" by Sarah McLachlan – 4.32

Disc 6
 "Ice Cream" by Sarah McLachlan – 2.49
 "To Sheila" by The Smashing Pumpkins – 4.57
 "Walking With A Ghost" by Tegan and Sara – 2.43
 "When I Get Up" by Tegan and Sara – 2.46
 "You Wouldn't Like Me" by Tegan and Sara – 3.02
 "Neil" by Tenacious D – 3.17
 "After The Gold Rush" by Thom Yorke – 3.57
 "Street Spirit (Fade Out)" by Thom Yorke – 4.27
 "Innocent When You Dream" by Tom Waits – 5.31
 "Bob Dylan's 49th Beard" by Wilco – 2.26
 "Company In My Back" by Wilco – 3.43
 "Mammas Don't Let Your Babies Grow Up To Be Cowboys" by Willie Nelson – 2.38
 "Time Slips Away/Crazy" by Willie Nelson – 4.30

References

ITunes-exclusive releases
2006 live albums
2006 compilation albums
Neil Young
Albums produced by John Hanlon